Viola cucullata, the hooded blue violet, marsh blue violet or purple violet, is a species of the genus Viola native to eastern North America, from Newfoundland west to Ontario and Minnesota, and south to Georgia. It is a recipient of the Royal Horticultural Society's Award of Garden Merit.

The leaves form a basal cluster; they are simple, up to  broad, with an entire margin and a long petiole. The flowers are violet, dark blue and occasionally white. with five petals. Its habitats include wet meadows, prairies, and fields.

Symbolism 
The purple violet is the provincial flower of New Brunswick.

The purple violet is the official flower of the sorority Sigma Sigma Sigma.

The purple violet is also one of the official flowers of the Sigma Phi Epsilon fraternity.

References

cucullata
Flora of Eastern Canada
Provincial symbols of New Brunswick
Flora of the Northeastern United States
Flora of the Southeastern United States
Flora of the North-Central United States
Flora without expected TNC conservation status